Regan Grace (born 12 December 1996) is a Welsh professional dual code rugby footballer who plays as a er for French union side Racing 92 in the Top 14.

He started his professional career coming through the academy and playing six seasons with English league side St Helens in the Super League. 

He has represented Wales at international level for rugby league.

Background
Grace was born in Port Talbot, Wales and is of Jamaican descent.

He is the brother of television personality Lateysha Grace, and cousin of rugby footballer Calvin Wellington.

Grace originally played rugby union, and started his career at Aberavon Quins RFC. He was also a member of the Ospreys youth teams.

Club career
Grace joined St Helens in 2014, when he was only 17.

His first Super League appearance came on Good Friday, 14 April, 2017 in the derby match against Wigan where he scored a try on debut. The following month he signed a new two-and-half year contract with St Helens.  Since that moment, Grace was a regular in the St Helens side making 139 appearances by the end of the 2021 season and scoring 87 tries.  Among those matches have been two Challenge Cup finals. The first was the 2019 Challenge Cup Final defeat by Warrington at Wembley Stadium  The second was the 26–12 2021 Challenge Cup Final victory over Castleford. During the 2021 Challenge Cup Grace was the leading try-scorer, scoring seven including a hat-trick against Huddersfield in the quarter-finals, and two in the semi-final against Hull FC.

Grace has also played in three Super League Grand Finals as St Helens won the 2019, 2020 and 2021 Grand Finals.
On 5 July 2022, Grace signed a contract to join Rugby Union side Racing 92 in 2023.
On 2 August 2022, it was announced that Grace had ruptured his achilles during St Helens heavy defeat against Salford which would rule him out for the remainder of the 2022 Super League season.

International career
He played for Wales in the 2017 World Cup qualifiers, scoring two tries in the country's first game.

He was selected in the Wales 9s squad for the 2019 Rugby League World Cup 9s.

References

External links
St Helens profile
SL profile
Saints Heritage Society profile

1996 births
Living people
Racing 92 players
Rugby league players from Port Talbot
Rugby league wingers
Rugby union players from Port Talbot
St Helens R.F.C. players
Wales national rugby league team players
Welsh rugby league players
Welsh rugby union players
Welsh people of Jamaican descent
British sportspeople of Jamaican descent